Valery Savin (born 21 June 1951) is a Soviet ski jumper. He competed in the normal hill event at the 1984 Winter Olympics.

References

External links
 

1951 births
Living people
Soviet male ski jumpers
Olympic ski jumpers of the Soviet Union
Ski jumpers at the 1984 Winter Olympics
Sportspeople from Sakhalin Oblast